Crespin is the name or part of the name of several communes in France:

 Crespin, Aveyron, in the Aveyron department
 Crespin, Nord, in the Nord department
 Crespin, Tarn, in the Tarn department
 Saint-Crespin, in the Seine-Maritime department